The Dakar–Niger Railway connects Dakar, Senegal to Koulikoro, Mali. The name refers to the Niger River, not the Republic of Niger. It serves many cities in Senegal, including Thiès, and in Mali, including Kayes, Kita, Kati, Bamako. The line covers a course of 1,287 km of which 641 km lies in Mali. The line is managed by the Transrail consortium.

As of 2013 passenger services in Mali were only being offered three days between Bamako and Kayes via Kati and Diamou. There were no international passenger trains in operation in 2014 but passenger services in Senegal existed between Dakar and Thiès.

History

Construction

Construction work on the Dakar–Niger Railway began at the end of the 19th century under the French general Gallieni, commander of French Sudan.

The railroad connected the Niger River with the port of Dakar, allowing the transport of raw materials across the globe. The line was completed at the beginning of the 20th century, the Kayes-Koulikoro section being inaugurated in 1904.
However, the final section of the line did not open until 1924.

1947 strike
In 1947, the railroad workers went on a several-month strike to obtain the same rights as the French railwaymen.  The successful strike was celebrated as a turning point in the anti-colonial struggle by Senegalese writer Ousmane Sembène in his 1960 novel, Les bouts de bois de Dieu.

Post-independence operation
With the independence of Mali and Senegal, after the break-up of the Mali Federation, control of the railroad was divided between two national organisations, the Régie des Chemin de fer du Mali (RCFM) and the Régie des Chemins de Fer du Sénégal.

An agreement between Senegal and Mali in 1962 determined the common operation of the line by the two railway companies.

Accidents
An accident, which happened on 13 May 2009, killed five and injured thirty-seven, when a Dakar bound train came off the tracks between Bala and Goudiry in Tambacounda Region, Senegal.  Four carriages reportedly overturned, but no official cause has been determined.

Current status 

In October 2003, Senegal and Mali privatised the railway following pressure from the World Bank. The Transrail Consortium, a Franco-Canadian management consortium, took over management of the line, changing hands several times. Management issues and a lack of investment led to serious degradation of the infrastructure and rolling stock and numerous delays. In Senegal, the maximum speed of the trains in many places have been limited to 20 km/h due to the bad state of the tracks.

Despite Transrail's obligation to maintain a passenger service, they concentrated on the transport of goods. Many stations have been closed and the numbers of connections reduced, creating difficulties for isolated communities. Apart from the petit train de banlieue, twice-daily service between Dakar and Thiès, passenger services have been suspended since the 2009 accident.

Transrail was bought in 2007 by the Belgian company Vecturis. The line has not operated since May 2010. In 2015, the governments of Mali and Senegal reached an agreement with China Railway Construction Corp (International) to restore the respective parts of the line. The concession to Transrail was terminated, and a new entity, Dakar Bamako Ferroviaire was to take its place.

Conversion to standard gauge is proposed.

Statistics

"Tableau comparative des exportations par rail" No sources are given for any of this data, which shows the number of tons of different products exported in various years:

Technical 
 Gauge: 
 Brakes: The railway uses vacuum brakes. 
 Couplers: Buffers and Chain, European. - see loco CC2286.
 Highest point  near Bamako.

Branch lines 
There are a number of branch lines including:
 Dakar–Saint-Louis railway, from Thiès to Saint-Louis
 Louga–Linguère
 Guinguinéo–Kaolack
 Diourbel–Mbaké
 Tambacounda–Baja Kunda (proposed)

See also 

 Rail transport in Mali
 Rail transport in Senegal
 Railway stations in Mali
 Railway stations in Senegal
 Transport in Mali
 Transport in Senegal
 West Africa Regional Rail Integration

References

External links 

International railway lines
Dakar
French West Africa
Metre gauge railways in Senegal
Metre gauge railways in Mali
Mali–Senegal relations